Laccase (multicopper oxidoreductase) domain containing 1 is a protein in humans that is encoded by the LACC1 gene.

References 

Genes
Human proteins